Borut Urh (born 28 July 1974) is a former professional tennis player from Slovenia. He achieved a career-high singles ranking of world No. 281 in 1999 and a career-high doubles ranking of world No. 160 in 1997.

Urh participated in 12 Davis Cup ties for Slovenia from 1993 to 2001, posting a 4–7 record in singles and a 7–2 record in doubles.

Challengers finals

Doubles (2 titles)

External links
 
 
 

1974 births
Slovenian male tennis players
Sportspeople from Ljubljana
Living people
People from the Municipality of Radovljica
Mediterranean Games silver medalists for Slovenia
Mediterranean Games medalists in tennis
Competitors at the 1997 Mediterranean Games